Dunkeld Cathedral Manse is an historic building in Dunkeld, Perth and Kinross, Scotland. It is two storeys, with a four-window frontage and single-storey out buildings.

The building was purchased in 1887 as a manse and reconstructed, with designs by James Macintyre Henry.

See also 
 List of listed buildings in Dunkeld And Dowally, Perth and Kinross

References 

Manse, Dunkeld Cathedral
Category B listed buildings in Perth and Kinross
1715 establishments in Scotland

Clergy houses in Scotland